Olympia London International Horse Show is one of the UK's biggest equestrian competitions, held at Olympia, London. It is best known for its showjumping, however it also has competitions in horse showing, driving, mounted games, dog agility and more recently dressage. Evening sessions are broadcast live by the BBC each year, with the puissance. It is held over seven days in the week preceding Christmas that involves over 400 horses and ponies, and many of the events are Christmas themed.

The show is split into ticketed morning, afternoon and evening sessions.

History 
The Olympia venue opened its doors to the public on Boxing Day in 1886. It had an exquisite design with a sky-high roof over 100 ft,  marble columns, and banquet rooms that were paneled with oak. It was named "Olympia" in hopes to keep the fulfillment and commitment in the future years to come.

The first show in its current form was held in 1907, however an agricultural show (known as the first great horse show) has been held here since 1888. Reginald Gardiner Heaton, a horse breeder from Chatteris in Cambridgeshire, is said to have thought up the show. Early in 1906, Gardiner Heaton invited friends to dinner with the intention of persuading them to organise an international show on similar lines to those in New York, Paris and Brussels. The dinner was successful and Reginald Heaton became the Managing Director, a post he held for over 25 years.

The inaugural show was attended by much of the upper class including Edward VII, Alexandra of Denmark, George V, Princess Mary Adelaide of Cambridge

The entrants were from around the world; France, Italy, Belgium and even Russia.

Lord Lonsdale then president of the National Sporting Club of Britain was the Show's first President. The roll of Directors listed in early programmes included many prominent and wealthy patrons with at least 10 Dukes, 11 Marquises, 54 Earls, 25 Viscounts, 80 Lords, and 28 Knights who were made honorary Vice-Presidents.

The show was closed during World War I and suffered from the economic instability and industrialisation between the wars. In 1939 the last International Horse Show was held at Olympia. It was resurrected in 1947 at a different venue in White City, London. However, in December 1972, Reginald Heaton and Raymond Brooks-Ward decided to bring a horse show back to Olympia. Olympia – The London International Horse Show has since become a highlight of the equestrian calendar and part of the equestrian Christmas tradition.

The London International Horse Show celebrated its 100th Anniversary in 2007 as 'one of Europe's oldest equine competitions’. In 2010 it was held as CSI 5*-W (Show Jumping World Cup event) and CDI-W (Dressage World Cup event).

Competitions 
The show has FEI competitions in combined driving, dressage and show jumping as well as showing and mounted games.

Combined Driving 
There are three combined driving events, the extreme driving and two FEI World Cup classes. A driver can drive a single horse, two horses or four horses, round a set of obstacles against the clock, with two grooms also on the carriage. Faults are gained if an obstacle is knocked or the incorrect route is taken, the top score with least faults wins.

Combined driving tests the driver's ability. It also tests the horses speed and athleticism. There are three phases that the participants go through: driven dressage, marathon and cones.

Driven dressage is designed to test the driver and the horses on harmoniousness, the simplicity of movements in the arena,

Marathon assesses the horses fitness and agility. It also tests the driver's precision as they steer around difficult objects such as water and sharp turns trying to obtain the fastest time.

Cones is where the driver and the horses have to go through a set of cones without running into them.

Dressage 
On the first day of the modern show, there is an FEI Grand Prix invitational class. On the second day there is an FEI dressage to music class where riders are allowed to choreograph their own routine to music incorporating a number of compulsory movements.

Dressage is focused on the overall physique of the horse. Due to the subtle aids of the rider, the horse seems like it is making the movements on its own. In this competitions, the horse is judged on its walk, trot, and canter along with its transitions throughout its paces. (Collection-extension-collection)

Showjumping 
The show has showjumping classes on each day of the show, each with Christmas themed names such as the Longines Christmas Cracker. These culminate in the 1.60m FEI Show Jumping World Cup on the Saturday and the Grand Prix on the Sunday . Riders generally compete over the week and have the chance of gaining points in each class for leading rider.

Many of the top showjumping riders in the world compete annually, as well as many of Britain's finest, including Ellen Whitaker, Tim Stockdale, Ben Maher, Nick Skelton and many more.

The event also has non FEI competitions including the Puissance, the six bar, accumulators, mini-major and the Markel Champions Challenge where jockeys compete at showjumping to raise money for the injured jockeys fund.

Showing 
The show hosts the final for the British Show Pony Society Mountain and Moorland championships and the Olympia Senior Showing Series Championships.

Exhibits 
In more recent years, the show also has exhibition guests which show different forms of horsemanship from around the world.  Attendees include the Metropolitan Police Service's mounted regiment.

Each year there is also a Shetland Grand National where a group of riders aged 8–14 ride Shetland ponies around a track over small jumps mimicking the Grand National held at Aintree. Many of these riders have progressed onto becoming professional jockeys such as Sam Twiston-Davies. All proceeds of the event go to the Bob Champion cancer trust.

Every session concludes with the Christmas Finale, a mix of theatrics, dancing, singing ending with a visit from Father Christmas himself in a horse-drawn carriage.

Kennel Club Dog Agility 
One of the most favorite parts about this show, is that dogs perform in different classes before each competitions. There could be ABC, which is Anything But a Collie, or there could be small dog pairs.

20 dogs who compete in the quarter final will go onto the semi-finals at this show.

These dogs run around racing and jumping over obstacles to compete for the fastest time.

Care of the Horses 
These horses are well taken care of when they compete at the Olympia London Horse show. 276 stables are put together for all of the horses that are participating in the show, 32 tons of bedding are put into each stable to ensure that the horses stay warm and dry.

50 bales of Hay and 82 bales of Haylage that the horses will eat to be fully nourished over the time the event occurs.

Gallery

External links 
 Olympia Horse Show Website
 Olympia Horse Show results (search "London" in the input field)

References

Equestrian sports competitions in the United Kingdom
Sports competitions in London
Show jumping events
Dressage events
Equestrian sports in England
Horse driving competition
Olympia London
Horse showing and exhibition